The Church of Christ the Savior is an Armenian Apostolic church in Krym village, Myasnikovsky District, Rostov Oblast, Russia. It is also officially declared as an architectural monument of regional significance of cultural heritage of Russia.

History 
August 23, 1895 the construction of the Church of Christ the Savior in Krym village was approved by the decree of Emperor Nicholas II. The construction works were finished in 1902. During ten following years, two parochial schools for boys and girls were opened here an both of them had more than 150 students each.

In 1930s the church was closed on decision of local authorities.

During World War II and German occupation of the region, divine services continued there again. Yet already in 1960, Soviet authorities once again decided to close the church and use its premises as a workshop. Later the church building was turned into granary.

In 1982 the building was renovated, in 1996 it was consecrated and opened again. Now it is also officially declared as an architectural monument of regional significance of cultural heritage of Russia.

Architecture 
The church was built in the style of Armenian architecture. The influence of Armenian architecture is evident in a number of constructive features: first of all, it has clear geometric construction. Each detail of exterior corresponds to the structural forms of interior.

The bell tower has a form of the square. The side rooms adjoining the bell tower are elevated to the level of church's corner offices.

References

Churches in Rostov Oblast
Armenian Apostolic churches in Russia
Cultural heritage monuments of regional significance in Rostov Oblast